Lady Beware is a 1987 American thriller film directed by Karen Arthur and starring Diane Lane, Michael Woods and Cotter Smith. It was filmed on location in and around Pittsburgh.

Plot

Katya Yarno is a window dresser for Horne's department store who specializes in displays with sexy, slightly kinky themes. Surrounded by the equipment of her trade—mannequins and lingerie—Katya lives in a loft apartment in downtown Pittsburgh. She spends her evenings taking her bath by candlelight and thinking up new and more provocative window displays. Katya soon becomes the obsession of Jack Price, a handsome (and married) psychopath. Jack proceeds to stalk Katya and makes her life a living hell. Tired of being harassed, Katya decides to give Jack a taste of his own medicine.

Cast

 Diane Lane as Katya Yarno
 Michael Woods as Jack Price
 Cotter Smith as Mac Odell
 Peter Nevargic as Lionel
 Edward Penn as Mr. Thayer
 Tyra Ferrell as Nan
 Trisha Simmons as Sylvia Price
 Clayton D. Hill as Police Officer #1
 David Crawford as Katya's father
 Ray Laine as Doctor
 Bingo O'Malley as Man in Window
 Don Brockett as Locksmith

Production

Development
Arthur began working on Lady Beware in the late '70s, shortly after the success of her second feature, The Mafu Cage, which screened at Cannes, landed her a four-picture deal at Universal. Universal, however, ended up rejecting the project, which ended up having "100 homes, 17 drafts, and eight writers," as Arthur told The Los Angeles Times in 1986 ahead of the film's release. "The purse-holders are men, and they attempted to make Lady Beware into a violent picture," Arthur added. "I'm not interested in making a picture where a woman gets beat up. I want to show how a lady deals with this kind of insidious violence. A policeman can't help."

Filming
The film was shot on location in Pittsburgh during the summer of 1986 after Scotti Brothers Entertainment agreed to finance and distribute it. The budget was reportedly under $2 million. Lady Beware's 28 days of shooting took place primarily in the city's North Side and downtown neighborhoods.

Release

Home media 
Lady Beware was released on VHS and Laserdisc in 1988 by International Video Entertainment. A second VHS release was put out in 1991 by Avid Home Entertainment.

Controversy 
Arthur did not approve of the film's final cut, which she said was re-edited by the producers to appeal to the exploitation crowd. "[Some distributors asked for] more sex, so they took outtakes of Diane Lane standing there naked and incorporated them into the film," she told the Los Angeles Times ahead of the film's release. "To me, that's exploitative. They printed up negatives where I never said print. I, as a female director, would never exploit a woman's body and use it as a turn-on." Arthur added that she did not remove her name from the film because she thought it would be unfair to the actors, who can't remove their names from the final product.

References

External links
 
 
 
 

1987 films
1980s erotic thriller films
1987 independent films
1980s psychological thriller films
American independent films
American psychological thriller films
American erotic thriller films
Films about stalking
Films directed by Karen Arthur
Films scored by Craig Safan
Films set in Pittsburgh
Films shot in Pennsylvania
1980s English-language films
1980s American films